The Canadian Headache Society (CHS) is an organization of health care professionals in Canada devoted to headache care, research and education. CHS makes recommendations for the diagnostic criteria as well as guidelines for the nonpharmacologic and pharmacological management of migraine headache in clinical practice. Headache Network Canada – a Canadian registered charity – and CHS maintain an educational website in joint partnership  on the subject of headache disorders; both for the general public and health care professionals.

References

External links
 Headache Network Canada Website maintained in partnership with the Canadian Headache Society.

Medical and health organizations based in Alberta
Neurology organizations